William Jones   was a professional baseball player who  played catcher and outfield in the American Association for the 1882 Baltimore Orioles and in the Union Association for the 1884 Philadelphia Keystones.

External links

Baltimore Orioles (AA) players
Philadelphia Keystones players
Major League Baseball outfielders
Major League Baseball catchers
Baseball players from Syracuse, New York
Chester Blue Stockings players
Wilmington Blue Hens players
Year of death missing
Year of birth missing
19th-century baseball players